Lorquí is a Spanish municipality in the  autonomous community of Murcia. It has a population of 6,493 (2006) and an area of 15 km2 .

Demographics 
The population of Lorquí has more than quadrupled since 1900 and continues to grow at a fast pace, growing 18% from 1991 to 2005.

Sports 
The community enjoys soccer games at the Juan de la Cierva stadium, completed in 2002, which can seat 2,000 spectators. The stadium is home to the Club de Fútbol Atlético Ciudad. The 18th-century church of Santiago Apostol is also in the town.

References

External links
 Ayuntamiento de Lorquí 

This article contains information from the Spanish Wikipedia article Lorquí, accessed on January 10, 2008.

Municipalities in the Region of Murcia